The Combat Capabilities Development Command (CCDC) Soldier Center, now CCDC SC, was formerly the United States Army Natick Soldier Research, Development and Engineering Center, and is a tenant unit of the United States Army Natick Soldier Systems Center (SSC), or Soldier Systems Center Natick. CCDC SC is a military research complex and installation in Natick, Massachusetts, charged by the U.S. Department of Defense with the research and development (including fielding and sustainment) of food, clothing, shelters, airdrop systems, and other servicemember support items for the U.S. military. The installation includes facilities from all the military services, not just the Army, and is so configured to allow cross-service cooperation and collaboration both within the facility and with the many academic, industrial and governmental institutions in the Greater Boston Area. 

The CCDC is subordinate to United States Army Futures Command (AFC) headquartered in Austin, Texas, which was activated in July 2018. Futures Command was formerly U.S. Army Research, Development, and Engineering Command (RDECOM) at Aberdeen Proving Ground.

The SSC is sometimes called the Natick Army Labs, although this designation more properly refers to one of its tenant units, the United States Army Combat Capabilities Development Command Soldier Center.

The installation
The SSC occupies  at its main Natick campus and has an additional  in neighboring communities. The main campus is located to the northwest of Natick center and abuts upon Lake Cochituate.

Employee/tenant numbers total 1,957 (159 military personnel, 1,048 civilians and 750 contractors).

The SSC public relations office reports that the installation’s FY2006 funding totaled approximately $1 billion and that the facilities infuse more than $135 million annually into the local economy through installation salaries, utilities and local contracts.

The installation commander is a U.S. Army Brigadier General, currently BG Vincent Malone, who also serves as the Deputy Commanding General of the U.S. Army Combat Capabilities Development Command.

Mission
The SSC includes facilities designed to research and test both materials (textiles, combat rations), advanced technologies and human performance (human research volunteers) under simulated environmental extremes (altitude, heat, cold, wind, etc.). The requirement for improved combat rations has led to groundbreaking developments in  the field of food irradiation and freeze-drying techniques. Improved body armor, new military parachuting technology, and enhanced military garments designed for a variety of environments are all ongoing efforts.

History

Construction of the Quartermaster Research Facility at Natick, authorized by Congress in October 1949, began in November 1952. A year later, the QRF was redesignated as the Quartermaster Research and Development Center and four years later as the Quartermaster Research and Engineering Command.

July 1961 saw the activation of the U.S. Army Research Institute of Environmental Medicine at Natick and a year later the QREC was placed under the U.S. Army Materiel Command (AMC). In November 1962, the QREC was redesignated as Natick Laboratories and the following year the Food and Container Institute moved to Natick. July 1967 saw the Navy Clothing and Textile Research Facility relocate to Natick.

Natick Laboratories became a subordinate element to the Troop Support Command in July 1973 and was redesignated two years later as the U.S. Army Natick Development Center and reassigned to the AMC. The NDC was redesignated the U.S. Army Natick Research and Development Command in January 1976 and assigned to the U.S. Army Materiel Development and Readiness Command. (The same month, AMC was redesignated the U.S. Army Materiel Development and Readiness Command (DARCOM).)

In September 1980, the NRDC was redesignated as the U.S. Army Natick Research & Development Laboratories and three years later as the U.S. Army Natick Research and Development Center, a subordinate element of the U.S. Army Troop Support Command in St. Louis, Missouri. (DARCOM and TSC merged in July 1992 forging the U.S. Army Aviation & Troop Command, St. Louis, Mo.)

In 1982, Natick Labs surrendered control of 3,100 acres in the Massachusetts towns of Hudson, Maynard, Stow and Sudbury to Fort Devens to become a field training facility. The land had been an ordnance supply depot during World War II. After being an Environmental Protection Agency "superfund" cleanup site in the 1990s it became the Assabet River National Wildlife Refuge.

In October 1992, the NRDC was redesignated the U.S. Army Natick Soldier Research, Development and Engineering Center, still a subordinate element of the ATC. A U.S. Army Soldier Systems Command (SSC) was activated at Natick in November 1994.  Elements subsequently established at the SSC included the Sustainment & Readiness Directorate (February 1995) and Product Manager-Soldier Support (October 1995); elements subsequently relocated to Natick included the Clothing and Services Office (October 1996; from Ft. Lee, Virginia) and Product Manager-Force Provider (June 1997).  The Sustainment & Readiness Directorate became the  Integrated Material Management Center in October 1997. SSC merged with the Chemical Biological Defense Command to become the Soldier and Biological Chemical Command in October 1998. At this time the installation was renamed the United States Army Soldier Systems Center. At some time prior to January 2017 the installation was renamed Soldier Systems Center Natick.

Tenant units and facilities

The SSC hosts several tenant units and facilities at its Natick installation:

The United States Army Combat Capabilities Development Command Soldier Center (CCDC SC), formerly known as United States Army Natick Soldier Research, Development and Engineering Center (NSRDEC), or as the U.S. Army Natick Soldier Center (NSC), or as The Natick Army Labs, an element of the United States Army Combat Capabilities Development Command (CCDC), formerly U.S. Army Research, Development, and Engineering Command (RDECOM) at Aberdeen Proving Ground, Maryland. 
The United States Army Research Institute of Environmental Medicine (USARIEM), a subordinate lab of the U. S. Army Medical Research and Material Command (USAMRMC), headquartered at Fort Detrick, MD, USA.
The United States Army Installation Management Command (IMCOM)
The United States Army Integrated Logistics and Support Center (ILSC)
The United States Coast Guard Clothing Design and Technical Office (CDTO)
The United States Navy Clothing and Textile Research Facility
The Program Executive Office (PEO) Soldier
The United States Army Product Manager Force Sustainment Systems (PM FSS)
The United States Army RDECOM Acquisition Center - Natick, the Natick Contracting Division of RDECOM AC, Aberdeen Proving Ground, Maryland
An office of the General Services Administration (GSA)
An office of the Hanscom Federal Credit Union
An office of the United States Health Services Command
An office of the Defense Automated Printing Service
An office of the United States Army Audit Agency
The Doriot Climatic Chamber Complex
Combat Rations Production and Packaging Facility
3-D Anthropometrics Laboratory
Camouflage Evaluation Facility
Rain Court
Hydro-Environmental Chamber
Shade Room
Fiber Plant
Thermal and Flame Laboratory
Military Operations in Urban Environment (MOUT) Lab/Facility

Soldier Lethality 
Soldier Lethality is a priority of the U.S. Army Futures Command (AFC). The aim is to modernize the capabilities of the individual soldier. The Soldier Lethality Cross-functional team (CFT) operates within constraints of requirements, acquisition, science and technology, test, resourcing, costing, and sustainment. PEO Soldier (the acquisition branch) coordinates with this Cross-functional team.

Products and systems

Natick Labs has developed or is developing the following items or systems:
Meal, Ready-to-Eat
Unitized Group Ration
Irradiated food
The "instant chapel"
Bulletproof clothing
MOLLE Loadcarriage Equipment
Land Warrior
Future Soldier
Future Force Warrior
Collective Protection Shelters
Personnel Armor System for Ground Troops
Interceptor Body Armor
Quarpel, a water-repellent, water and stain resistant textile treatment

See also 

Future Integrated Soldier Technology
Armed Forces Recipe Service (maintained by Natick Labs until 2009)
Close quarters combat
Close combat
Small unit tactics
List of military installations in Massachusetts

References

Earls, Alan R., (2005) U.S. Army Natick Laboratories: The Science Behind the Soldier (Series: Images of America), Arcadia Publishing.
This article contains information that originally came from US Government publications and websites and is in the public domain.

External links
Program Executive Office (PEO) Soldier
Official SSC Website
 Official Garrison Website

Soldier Systems Center
Buildings and structures in Middlesex County, Massachusetts
Historic American Engineering Record in Massachusetts
Army, Soldier Systems Center
Natick, Massachusetts
Installations of the U.S. Army in Massachusetts
1952 establishments in Massachusetts